The Wildberg is a  high mountain in the Schesaplana group of the Rätikon mountain range in the Austrian  state Vorarlberg.

Ascents 
 From the alpine club hut Mannheimer Hütte in 20 to 30 minutes.
 From Mottakopf (2176 m) via the north ridge; UIAA grade III. First ascentionists of this route were E. A. Wehrlin and A. Beck in 1886.

References 

Two-thousanders of Austria
Mountains of the Alps
Mountains of Vorarlberg